The 2013 Grand Prix of the Americas was the second round of the 2013 MotoGP season. It was held at the Circuit of the Americas in Austin, Texas on 21 April 2013. This was the first GP race at the circuit.

Marc Márquez won his first MotoGP race, in which was only his second race in the top level, and became the youngest ever rider to win a MotoGP race.

It was the first Grand Prix since the 1982 Swedish Grand Prix where in all three categories, there were three new winners: at the Anderstorp it was Iván Palazzese (125cc), Roland Freymond (250cc) and Takazumi Katayama (500cc) who won.

Classification

MotoGP

Moto2

Moto3

Notes:
 – The Moto3 race was stopped after ten laps and restarted over a distance of five laps.

Championship standings after the race (MotoGP)
Below are the standings for the top five riders and constructors after round two has concluded.

Riders' Championship standings

Constructors' Championship standings

 Note: Only the top five positions are included for both sets of standings.

References

Motorcycle Grand Prix of the Americas
Americas
Motorcycle Grand Prix
Motorcycle Grand Prix
Motorcycle Grand Prix of the Americas